Jesse Dukeminier (August 12, 1925 – April 20, 2003) was a professor of law for 40 years at the University of California, Los Angeles, and authored or co-authored a significant number of articles and textbooks in the areas of property law, wills, trusts, and estates. Dukeminier's Trusts and Estates textbook has been described as "widely used and nationally recognized". Updates are still being produced to the text, with the Dukeminier name, alongside coauthors, remaining on the work.

Dukeminier was born in West Point, Mississippi in 1925 and received a bachelor's degree from Harvard University in 1948, and his Juris Doctor from Yale in 1951 before briefly entering the practice of law with a Wall Street law firm. He then taught law at the University of Kentucky College of Law and the University of Minnesota Law School, and visited at Harvard and the University of Chicago before taking a position at UCLA in 1963.

References

External links
UCLA law professor remembered for geniality
Dukeminier Award

American legal scholars
American legal writers
New York (state) lawyers
1925 births
2003 deaths
Harvard University faculty
University of Chicago faculty
Harvard University alumni
Yale Law School alumni
UCLA School of Law faculty
Scholars of property law
People from West Point, Mississippi
20th-century American lawyers